The Melanorosauridae were a family of sauropodomorph dinosaurs which lived during the Late Triassic and Early Jurassic. The name Melanorosauridae was first coined by Friedrich von Huene in 1929. Huene assigned several families of dinosaurs to the infraorder "Prosauropoda": the Anchisauridae, the Plateosauridae, the Thecodontosauridae, and the Melanorosauridae. Since then, these families have undergone numerous revisions. Galton and Upchurch (2004) considered Camelotia, Lessemsaurus, and Melanorosaurus members of the family Melanorosauridae. A more recent study by Yates (2007) indicates that the melanorosaurids were instead early sauropods.

References
 Galton, P.M & Upchurch, P. (2004). "Prosauropoda". In D. B. Weishampel, P. Dodson, & H. Osmólska (eds.), The Dinosauria (second edition). University of California Press, Berkeley 232–258.
 Yates, Adam M. (2007), "The first complete skull of the Triassic dinosaur Melanorosaurus Haughton (Sauropodomorpha: Anchisauria)", in Barrett, Paul M. & Batten, David J., Special Papers in Palaeontology, vol. 77, pp. 9–55, 

 
Anchisauria
Prehistoric dinosaur families